Jokin is a given name. Notable people with the name include:

 Jokin Bildarratz (born 1963), Spanish politician
 Jokin Esparza (born 1988), Spanish footballer
 Jokin Ezkieta (born 1996), Spanish footballer
 Jokin Mújika (born 1962), Spanish cyclist

See also
 Jobin